PIFA Sports Football Club, or simply PIFA, is an Indian professional football club based in Mumbai, Maharashtra that competes in the Mumbai Football League, and participated in the I-League 2nd Division.

Players

2019 senior team squad

Honours

Men's team
 Nadkarni Cup
 Runners-up (3): 2011, 2016, 2017

Women's team
WIFA Women's Football League
Champions (1): 2021–22
Runners-up (1): 2022–23

References

Association football clubs established in 2006
I-League clubs
Football clubs in Mumbai
2006 establishments in Maharashtra
I-League 2nd Division clubs